June Shelton School (also known as Shelton School or simply Shelton) is a PK–12 co-educational private school in Dallas, Texas, United States. It was established in 1976 by June Ford Shelton for the treatment or accommodation of students with learning differences (LD). It has grown into an international demonstration, resource and research center.

It provides access to the Shelton organizations which include the Evaluation Center, Speech Clinic, and Outreach Center. Beginning in 2003, Shelton received research grants to help provide more answers for the LD population. The Early Intervention Program helps children with significant oral language disorders. Data on the most effective services is being analyzed. The Center for Advanced ADHD Research, Treatment and Education (CAARTE) is investigating sub types of ADHD and non-medication treatments. This study is in collaboration with the University of Texas Southwestern Medical Center and UTD Center for BrainHealth.

Notable staff 
 George Teague, former football coach

References

External links 
 

Private schools in Dallas
Independent Schools Association of the Southwest
Educational institutions established in 1976
1976 establishments in Texas